Mers Sultan is an arrondissement of Casablanca, in the Al Fida - Mers Sultan district of the Casablanca-Settat region of Morocco. As of 2004 it had 145,928 inhabitants.

Education
Groupe Scolaire Louis Massignon, a French international school, maintains one of its primary school campuses in Mers Sultan.

References

Arrondissements of Casablanca